Uzair Mahomed (born 20 August 1987) is a South African born English former cricketer.  Mahomed is a right-handed batsman who bowls right-arm off break.  He was born in Johannesburg, Transvaal Province and educated in England at Bradford Grammar School and Woodhouse Grove School.

Mahomed played a single Minor Counties Championship match for Northumberland against Staffordshire in 2005, the same season in which he joined Durham.  He played mostly for the Durham Second XI, before making a single List A appearance for Durham against Bangladesh A.  He scored 3 runs in this match, before being dismissed by Sajidul Islam.  Released by Durham at the end of the 2008 season, he played for the Northamptonshire Second XI in 2009, but he failed to gain a contract with the county.

References

External links
Uzair Mahomed at ESPNcricinfo

1987 births
Living people
Cricketers from Johannesburg
English people of South African descent
People educated at Bradford Grammar School
People educated at Woodhouse Grove School
English cricketers
Northumberland cricketers
Durham cricketers
English cricketers of the 21st century